The arrondissement of Quimper is an arrondissement of France in the Finistère department, Brittany. It has 84 communes.

Composition

The communes of the arrondissement of Quimper, and their INSEE codes, are:

 Arzano (29002)
 Audierne (29003)
 Bannalec (29004)
 Baye (29005)
 Bénodet (29006)
 Beuzec-Cap-Sizun (29008)
 Briec (29020)
 Cléden-Cap-Sizun (29028)
 Clohars-Carnoët (29031)
 Clohars-Fouesnant (29032)
 Combrit (29037)
 Concarneau (29039)
 Confort-Meilars (29145)
 Douarnenez (29046)
 Edern (29048)
 Elliant (29049)
 Ergué-Gabéric (29051)
 La Forêt-Fouesnant (29057)
 Fouesnant (29058)
 Gouesnac'h (29060)
 Goulien (29063)
 Gourlizon (29065)
 Guengat (29066)
 Guiler-sur-Goyen (29070)
 Guilligomarc'h (29071)
 Guilvinec (29072)
 Île-de-Sein (29083)
 Île-Tudy (29085)
 Le Juch (29087)
 Kerlaz (29090)
 Landrévarzec (29106)
 Landudal (29107)
 Landudec (29108)
 Langolen (29110)
 Locronan (29134)
 Loctudy (29135)
 Locunolé (29136)
 Mahalon (29143)
 Melgven (29146)
 Mellac (29147)
 Moëlan-sur-Mer (29150)
 Névez (29153)
 Penmarch (29158)
 Peumerit (29159)
 Pleuven (29161)
 Plobannalec-Lesconil (29165)
 Plogastel-Saint-Germain (29167)
 Plogoff (29168)
 Plogonnec (29169)
 Plomelin (29170)
 Plomeur (29171)
 Plonéis (29173)
 Plonéour-Lanvern (29174)
 Plouhinec (29197)
 Plovan (29214)
 Plozévet (29215)
 Pluguffan (29216)
 Pont-Aven (29217)
 Pont-Croix (29218)
 Pont-l'Abbé (29220)
 Pouldergat (29224)
 Pouldreuzic (29225)
 Poullan-sur-Mer (29226)
 Primelin (29228)
 Quéménéven (29229)
 Querrien (29230)
 Quimper (29232)
 Quimperlé (29233)
 Rédené (29234)
 Riec-sur-Bélon (29236)
 Rosporden (29241)
 Saint-Évarzec (29247)
 Saint-Jean-Trolimon (29252)
 Saint-Thurien (29269)
 Saint-Yvi (29272)
 Scaër (29274)
 Tourch (29281)
 Treffiagat (29284)
 Tréguennec (29292)
 Trégunc (29293)
 Tréméoc (29296)
 Tréméven (29297)
 Tréogat (29298)
 Le Trévoux (29300)

History

The arrondissement of Quimper was created in 1800. At the January 2017 reorganisation of the arrondissements of Finistère, it gained three communes from the arrondissement of Châteaulin.

As a result of the reorganisation of the cantons of France which came into effect in 2015, the borders of the cantons are no longer related to the borders of the arrondissements. The cantons of the arrondissement of Quimper were, as of January 2015:

 Arzano
 Bannalec
 Briec
 Concarneau
 Douarnenez
 Fouesnant
 Guilvinec
 Plogastel-Saint-Germain
 Pont-Aven
 Pont-Croix
 Pont-l'Abbé
 Quimper-1
 Quimper-2
 Quimper-3
 Quimperlé
 Rosporden
 Scaër

References

Quimper